Night and Day is a British mystery soap opera, produced by Granada Television for LWT, that first broadcast on 6 November 2001 on ITV, and ran until 5 June 2003. The series was launched as part of ITV's new early evening line-up, with an enormous amount of pre-publicity and trailers promoting the series. The series was written and created by screenwriter Caleb Ranson, with other contributors to the series including John Jackson, Jessica Townsend, Cris Cole, Elizabeth Delaney, Jeff Dodds, Robert Fraser, Adrian Hewitt, Martha Jay, Charles Lambert, Ed McCardie, Adrian Pagan, Bradley Quirk, Tony Ramsay and Catherine Stedman. The series opening theme, "Always & Forever", was performed by Kylie Minogue.

At first, the series rated well, even drawing comparisons to series such as Twin Peaks. However, as the series storylines became more bizarre and complex, it began to rate poorly, only gaining a small, cult fanbase, and was pushed to a later timeslot due to the lack of mainstream interest. Subsequently, little more than six months after the series premiered, filming wrapped on 17 May 2002, and the series was later axed by station executives, who cited low ratings as the principal reason. The final episode aired on screen on 5 June 2003.

Synopsis
The series begins on the sixteenth birthday of best friends Jane Harper and Della Wells, who live in the same street in Greenwich. However, before the day is over, Jane has disappeared. Over the next year, the lives of six families in the street become further intertwined as a tangled web of secrets and lies threaten to boil to the surface, and Jane's disappearance continues to have a devastating effect. The series combined typical soap opera plots, including babies switched at birth and clandestine affairs, with more unusual stories including murders at the catacombs, and an episode in which a mysterious stranger came to the street and stopped time to uncover the truth about the residents, only to eventually erase their memories of events of that alternative reality and turn everything back to normal.

Despite the series being axed, the decision was made long before the final episode was set to air allowing the producers to script an ending to the series. As the series comes to a close, Sam – wandering away from home – finds Jane working as a geisha, with no memory of who she was. He returned her to her family, and her return – coming on the heels of the year anniversary of her disappearance – only served to increase tensions and bring secrets into the open. The final episode, the eightieth when counting only the hour-long episodes, focused on revealing some of the secrets behind the characters and Jane being arrested for murder. The episode then flashed forward to four years later and looked at one day in the very different lives of the residents of Greenwich, as Jane was seemingly released from prison and came to discover what had happened since. However, Natalie later learns that Jane was not released, and had in fact died in her cell that morning, and that the presence was in fact her ghost. The final episode closed with a montage of moments from the series to Björk's All is Full of Love.

Broadcast
The series premiered with an unusual format: three thirty-minute episodes would air each week in a teatime slot, before being merged into one, single hour-long late-night "omnibus" episode, which aired on Thursdays, often containing additional explicit scenes (such as discussion or events that could not be aired in an earlier timeslot). The first thirty-minute episode attracted 2.2 million viewers, airing at 17:05 on 6 November 2001. Across the next few months, the series averaged 1.4 million viewers in this timeslot. However, on 27 March 2002, ITV announced it was removing the series from the teatime slot the following week. This was in response to the series' viewing figures rapidly declining, attracting only a 9% audience share and being beaten in the ratings by BBC Two's The Weakest Link and Channel 4's Richard & Judy.

The series' removal was so sudden that TV listings for the next week still advertised it. Speaking of the decision to axe the teatime episodes, Tony Woods, then head of continuing drama at ITV, stated that "The series has already established itself as cult viewing for young adults, and re-positioning it with a debut broadcast in the evening will build on its appeal". The series continued to air the hour long episodes in a later time slot, with some episodes airing as late as 2AM. Most episodes also aired later than billed, some almost ten minutes behind the advertised schedule. The vacant teatime slot was filled by repeats of game shows such as Catchphrase, You've Been Framed and Family Fortunes. Eventually, in January 2003, a relaunched version of Crossroads aired in the slot, before it too was also cancelled after only a few months on air. The final hour long 'omnibus' episode aired on 5 June 2003 and attracted 500,000 viewers, despite airing at 00:30.

In Australia, the series screened on ABC TV. It originally aired at 6pm on weeknights, as a lead into the evening news, but the later episodes were predominantly screened very late at night, in a similar fashion to the UK broadcast; although these retained the thirty-minute format.

Production
The series was first unveiled by ITV executives on 27 April 2001, before the leading cast were announced on 9 May. The series was commissioned in the wake of ITV losing Home and Away to Channel 5. The series eventually premiered in November 2001 after production delays halted filming and meant that the original premiere date was pushed back.

'Thornton Street' was in reality King George Street SE10, one of the most historic areas of Greenwich. Other locations in Greenwich included the Cutty Sark pub, the Old Greenwich Hospital and Greenwich Park. 'St Vincents Halfway House' was actually in the London Borough of Tower Hamlets. Interior shots were filmed at the Three Mills Studios in Bow.

Night and Day was nominated for ten awards at the British Soap Awards 2002, beating established rivals such as Hollyoaks and Emmerdale. It won one award, 'Hero of the year' (chosen by a panel of judges) for the character of Sam giving up football to look after his orphaned siblings. Filming had finished the day before the British Soap Awards.

Some five weeks before the final episode aired in 2003 many TV guides flagged up the weeks episode as the 'last in series'. Indeed, the Radio Times even printed a double page feature about the shows demise after 17 months on air. Quite why this error could have happened is unknown. This led to some fans thinking the series had ended on a knife-edge cliffhanger when in fact the next five weeks tied up all the loose ends to all plots.

In 2006, the Radio Times ran a small article about the fifth anniversary of Night and Day's premiere. The programme was described as being stylish but with little substance.

The series was never released on DVD or video. The sheer number of songs used on the soundtrack throughout the series would make a DVD release financially impractical as each artist would need to be paid a royalty fee. At the time of the shows final transmission rumours circulated on fan message boards of a clause in the production contract that prevents a rerun of the series until five years after its initial transmission. This has not been confirmed by ITV or LWT.

Cast

Main cast
 Georgina Walker as Jane Harper; beautiful, mysterious, bitchy and intimidating, Jane was the golden girl of the neighbourhood, the girl who had everything...or at least that is how it seemed.
 Nick Schofield as Ryan Harper; Jane's older brother is handsome, but insecure. A master manipulator, Ryan has learnt how to use people to his own will, and soon begins retreating back into this as he deals with being part of a broken home.
 Sally Dexter as Dr. Natalie Harper; Birth name: Natalie Brake. Jane's mother, a G.P. Despite being very highly-strung and quite secure, Natalie's initial ability to deal with her daughter's disappearance masks her true crumbling nature.
 Tim Wallers as Duncan Harper; Jane's father, subordinate to Natalie. Unlike Natalie and her friends, Duncan did not grow up in the area and feels increasingly alone as past events come back to haunt others, while he cannot understand what is going on.
 Stephanie Leonidas as Della Wells; Jane's best friend, shares her birthday. Della is blossoming into her own woman, but has always lived in the shadow of Jane, and always wanted to better understand her best friend. She has fallen in love with mysterious Josh Alexander who seems just as smitten with her, but her overprotective dad Alex is an obstacle in the way of true love.
 Lysette Anthony as Roxanne Doyle; Natalie's best friend, and Della's mother. Pregnant and prone to irrational outbursts.
 Joe McGann as Alex Wells; Roxanne's partner, he is the father of all her children but her oldest, Dennis. He has a shady past, including the fact that – in the year leading up to her disappearance – he was secretly dating Jane, his daughter's best friend. Overprotective of daughter Della and has many shady secrets he would rather keep to himself.
 Kevin Sacre as Dennis Doyle; Roxanne's eldest son. Has never fully trusted his stepdad, Alex, and is now discovering adulthood. A loser in love after being rejected by bitchy Jane Harper and catty Kate Ellis.
 Dominic Rickhards as Mike Brake; Natalie's younger brother. As a schoolboy, he fell for his teacher Fiona and – when she fell pregnant – the two got married. This early marriage has masked his true feelings of homosexuality, which are only now coming out.
 Glynis Barber as Fiona Brake; Mike's wife. Close to the children of the street given her nature as their schoolteacher.
 Lesley Joseph as Rachel Culgrin; the street's resident bitch, and a schoolteacher. She makes her feelings known on every subject, particularly the lifestyle of her nephew Sam, and her colleague Fiona.
 Stuart Manning as Sam Armstrong; an up-and-coming soccer player. Sam was Jane's first boyfriend, and the father of her unborn baby, although he wasn't aware of it at the time. Even though they never went all the way, she got pregnant when they were making out and he came too soon. Sam's life, however, changed when his parents were killed and he took in his sister Lucy, brother Ben, and had to deal with the sudden involvement in his life of his Aunt Rachel. Sam also consented to let Dennis move in with him.
 Daniella Isaacs as Lucy Armstrong; Sam's much younger sister. Her world is the most affected by the death of her parents, and she is struggling to understand the power struggle between Rachel and Sam.
 Gareth Hunt as Charlie Doyle; Roxanne's father, he runs the local pub and is probably the wisest of the neighbourhood. Charlie has been married several times.
 Joe Jacobs as Jimmy Hamilton Doyle; Charlie's son by a previous marriage, Jimmy is the same age as Jane and her friends and is a wild child.
 Christianne Gadd as Donna Doyle; Charlie's current wife, Brazilian.
 Cathy Tyson as Reverend Stephanie MacKenzie; the new reverend, who moves in to take over the "Halfway House" for less advantaged teens. She has a past with Natalie, Alex and Roxanne.
 Adam Paul Harvey as Tom Brake; Fiona and Mike's son, he has never been successful with girls – even though his best (female) friend is in love with him. He also is interested in film, constantly filming events that occur.
 Seb Castang as Josh Alexander; a resident of the Halfway House, Josh was seeing Jane, but after her disappearance he develops feelings for Della. Josh is gorgeous, broody and intense. He is rocked by strange visions and tortured by the thought that he might have killed Jane during one of his blackouts. He has slowly fallen in love with Della Wells but pushes her away as he is scared of hurting her.
 Debbie Korley as Frankie Radcliffe; Tom's best friend. She has always had a weird attitude to sex, and her feeling that sex is a disgusting will complicate her relationship with Tom.
 Sean Francis as Will Radcliffe; Frankie's father, business partner and best friend to Mike. He is a single dad, and is just starting to get back out on the dating scene – but also trying to juggle it with his life as a parent.
 Phoebe Thomas as Holly Curran; one of the most enigmatic residents, Holly lives at the Halfway House and is close with Josh. She regularly speaks her mind in regard to people she does not like. She knows about Jane and Alex's relationship.
 Julia Lee Smith as Kate Ellis; she is the only person who can match Ryan in a battle of manipulation, but her talent at this also masks her insecurity. A model, she uses her looks to get what she wants and can wrap men around her little finger without any hassle.

Recurring cast
 Jai Wilson as Becky Wells; daughter of Alex and Roxanne.
 Keya Wilson as Laura Wells; daughter of Alex and Roxanne.
 Bradley Walsh as Eddie 'Woody' Dexter; Danny's brother and Dennis's uncle. Woody had feelings for Natalie and returns just in time to find her marriage on the rocks.
 Phoebe Sweeney as Celeste Dexter; Woody's daughter, who becomes Ryan's girlfriend.
 Laurie Hagen as Francois Jardin; Jane's penpal from France who arrives in the aftermath, unaware of the tragedy that befell her, and whose letters may hold clues.
 Julie Legrand as Melanie Bradshaw; a weird nurse whose delivered Jane and Della and is supposed to deliver Roxanne's new baby. Roxanne is terrified of her and suspects that she might be the source of anonymous letters which warn Roxanne her baby is not safe.
 Dan D'Souza as Django Doyle; Charlie's son, a singer in Singapore who comes to stay unexpectedly and begins to manipulate his father.
 Paul Kynman as 'Malcolm Burns'; the caretaker of the halfway house and grounds, who disappears some time after Jane. His death is first pronounced a suicide, but it seems more likely that he was murdered.
 Jenna Boyd as Lydia; an unattractive parking inspector whom Sam starts to date out of feelings of guilt because of Jane.
 Max Anthony Foster as Ben Armstrong; Sam and Lucy's baby brother.
 Coralie Rose as Aunt Begonia; Donna's attractive sister, who falls for Jimmy, her nephew-by-marriage.
 Clarke Peters as Gabriel Huysman; a mysterious stranger who claims to be a private investigator and who questions the people around Jane.
 Shane Richie as Danny Dexter; Dennis's father, who may have been involved in Jane's disappearance.
 Flip Webster as Inspector Paisley; the officer who takes over Jane's case.

Episodes

Series 1 (2001—2002)

Series 2 (2002)

Series 3 (2002—2003)

References

External links
Night and Day opening titles on YouTube
 

2000s British television soap operas
2001 British television series debuts
2003 British television series endings
British television soap operas
ITV soap operas
Television series by ITV Studios
Media and communications in the Royal Borough of Greenwich
London Weekend Television shows
English-language television shows